Upon the Shadow is a French-Tunisian documentary directed by Nada Mezni Hafaiedh in 2017. The film discusses the topic of discrimination based on sexual orientation and gender identity in Tunisia.

The film premiered at the 2017 Thessaloniki Documentary Festival.

Synopsis 
Amina Sboui is a human rights activist surrounded by her friends who are people rejected by their families because of their sexual orientations and gender identities and whom she shelters at home. In the village of Sidi Bou Said, she discovers the challenges that the LGBTQI+ community faces in Tunisia in its struggle against the discrimination based on sexual orientation and sexual identity.

Cast 
 Amina Sboui 
 Sandra Neifer
 Ramy Ayari 
 Atef Pucci 
 Ayoub Moumene

Reception 
The film won the Bronze Tanit during the Carthage Film Festival for the year of 2017 in the "Documentary feature films" category.

See also 
 LGBT rights in Tunisia

References

External links 
 
 in Allociné

Films shot in Tunisia
2010s Arabic-language films
Tunisian LGBT-related films
Gay-related films
2017 films